On 6 January 1993, Lufthansa CityLine Flight 5634 departed Bremen Airport for Paris-Charles de Gaulle Airport at 17:30. Operating the flight was a Dash 8-300, registered D-BEAT with 23 passengers and crew.

When Flight 5634 was nearing Paris, a Korean Air Boeing 747 scraped an engine pod on landing, causing air traffic controllers to close the runway briefly. The pilots were notified to change course to another runway. While in clouds and heavy fog on short final, the airliner entered a high sink rate and crashed into the ground tail-first. The aircraft broke into two, but there was no fire. The crash killed 4 passengers and 19 further were injured in the accident.

References

External links

 Preliminary Accident Report- Bureau d'Enquêtes et d'Analyses pour la Sécurité de l'Aviation Civile 
 ASN Aircraft accident de Havilland Canada DHC-8-311 D-BEAT Paris-Charles de Gaulle Airport (CDG):
 Image of accident site – Bureau of Aircraft Accidents Archives

Accidents and incidents involving the De Havilland Canada Dash 8
Aviation accidents and incidents in France
Aviation accidents and incidents in 1993
5634
1993 in France
January 1993 events in Europe